The 26th Golden Horse Awards (Mandarin:第26屆金馬獎) took place on December 9, 1989 at National Theater in Taipei, Taiwan.

References

26th
1989 film awards
1989 in Taiwan